Ndokwa East is a Local Government Area of Delta State, Nigeria. Its headquarters are in the town of Aboh. 
 
It has an area of 1,617 km and a population of 103,171 at the 2006 census.

The postal code of the area is 322. The southernmost end of the area is Asaba-Assay.

References

Local Government Areas in Delta State